Willy Planckaert (born 5 April 1944 in Nevele) is a Belgian former road bicycle racer. His brothers, Eddy and Walter Planckaert, as well as his son Jo Planckaert, are also former professional road bicycle racers.

Major results

1965
1st, Brussels-Charleroi-Brussels
1st, Stage 1, Paris–Luxembourg
1966
 Points classification, Tour de France
1st, Stages 4 and 8
1st, Stage 2, Tour de Luxembourg
1967
1st, Grand Prix Pino Cerami
1st, Stages 5, 9 and 22b, Giro d'Italia
1969
1st, Stage 1, Tour de l'Oise
1970
1st, Stage 3b, Tour de Luxembourg
1973
1st, Stage 1, Tour de Luxembourg
1st, Stage 3, Four Days of Dunkirk
1974
1st, Omloop van de Vlaamse Scheldeboorden
1st, Omloop van het Houtland
1st, Stage 4, Tour de Pologne
1976
1st, Dwars door Vlaanderen
1st, Stage 1a, Critérium du Dauphiné Libéré
1st, Stage 5b, Four Days of Dunkirk
1977
1st, Overall, Étoile de Bessèges
1st, Stage 2, Four Days of Dunkirk

See also
Eddy Planckaert
Walter Planckaert
Jo Planckaert

References

External links
Profile by cyclinghalloffame.com
Profile by velo-club.net 

Living people
Belgian male cyclists
Belgian Tour de France stage winners
Belgian Giro d'Italia stage winners
1944 births
Cyclists from East Flanders
People from Nevele